Shatar Mohammad-e Sofla (also Romanized as Shāṭar Moḥammad-e Soflá) is a village in Mehrabad Rural District, Rudehen District, Damavand County, Tehran Province, Iran. At the 2006 census, its population was 13, in 4 families.

References 

Populated places in Damavand County